Ebersheim may refer to:
Ebersheim, Bas-Rhin, a French commune in the Bas-Rhin department
Ebersheim (Mainz), a borough of Mainz